William Nathaniel Roach (September 25, 1840September 7, 1902) was a United States senator from North Dakota.

Biography

Born in Washington, D.C., he attended the public schools, Gonzaga College High School and Georgetown University. He was a clerk in the quartermaster's department during the Civil War. He moved to Dakota Territory in 1879 and settled in Larimore; he was interested in mail contracts for several years and was a member of the Territorial House of Representatives in 1885.

Roach was an unsuccessful Democratic candidate for governor at the first State election in 1889 and again in 1891. He was elected to the U.S. Senate and served from March 4, 1893, to March 4, 1899. In 1893, a subcommittee in the Senate was convened to hear evidence that Roach had embezzled money while acting as an officer of a bank. Expulsion was considered, but the subcommittee decided the matter was too long past to take such action. He was an unsuccessful candidate for reelection and discontinued active business pursuits and lived in retirement in Washington, D.C. He died in New York City on September 7, 1902; interment was in the Congressional Cemetery, Washington, D.C.

See also
List of United States senators expelled or censured

References

|-

1840 births
1902 deaths
Burials at the Congressional Cemetery
Clerks
Democratic Party United States senators from North Dakota
Georgetown University alumni
Gonzaga College High School alumni
Members of the Dakota Territorial Legislature
People from Washington, D.C.
People of Washington, D.C., in the American Civil War
Union Army soldiers